Alexander the Great is a 2014 documentary miniseries about Alexander the Great, a co-production of ZDF, Arte and ORF for ZDF's brand Terra X. The series premiered on 25 October 2014 on Arte as a 90-minute film, and later broadcast on ZDF as a two-part series. It has been dubbed into English and Spanish.

Synopsis 
Over the centuries, the myth of Alexander the Great, an illustrious conqueror of antiquity, has been enriched. History retains from him the image of a fine strategist and an ambitious monarch who managed, in little more than a decade, to constitute an immense empire going from Greece to India. But what man was he really? Based on reconstructions, the documentary attempts to unravel the legend of historical reality, looking back on Alexander's journey, from his birth in 356 ʙᴄ to his presumably illness-related death in 323 ʙᴄ.

Cast 

 David Schütter as Alexander the Great
 Vladi Georgiev as child Alexander
  as Hephaestion
 Teodora Duhovnikova as Olympias
 Andrei Slabakov as Philip II of Macedon
  as Aristotle
  as Philotas
 Alexander Demandt as himself
 Hans-Joachim Gehrke as himself
  as herself

Episodes

Production 
The shooting started on 21 February 2014 and ended on 17 June of the same year. Filming locations took place in Greece, Iran, and a studio in Bulgaria.

References

External links 
  
 

ZDF original programming
ORF (broadcaster)
2010s German television miniseries
2010s biographical drama films
German docudrama films
Docudrama television series
Films about Alexander the Great
German biographical films
German historical films
German documentary television series
2014 German television series debuts
2014 German television series endings
Films set in ancient Alexandria
Television series set in ancient Greece
Television series set in Ancient India
Films shot in Bulgaria
Films shot in Greece
Films shot in Iran
2010s German films